The Tuxtla quail-dove (Zentrygon carrikeri) is a species of bird in the family Columbidae. It is endemic to southeastern Mexico.

Taxonomy and systematics

The Tuxtla quail-dove is monotypic. It and the purplish-backed quail-dove (Zentrygon lawrencii) of Central America were previously considered conspecific.

Description

The adult's head, neck, throat and breast are light bluish gray and the flanks light brown. It has a wide black malar stripe. Its back and wings are olive brown with little iridescence. Juveniles are darker all over with cinnamon edges to the upperparts' feathers and buff bars on the breast.

Distribution and habitat

The Tuxtla quail-dove is found only on two volcanos in the Sierra de los Tuxtlas of southeastern Mexico's Veracruz state, Volcán de San Martín and Sierra de Santa Marta.

Behavior

Feeding

The Tuxtla quail-dove forages singly or in pairs. No details of its diet have been published but it probably feeds on fruit, seeds, and invertebrates found in leaf litter.

Breeding

The only documented Tuxtla quail-dove nest was a loosely constructed platform supported by bamboo shoots; it contained one egg.

Vocalization

The Tuxtla quail-dove's song is "a three-syllable note 'whu-hu-whUuuw', with a clear emphasis on the last syllable." The overslurred last syllable is all that is usually heard at a distance.

Status

The IUCN has assessed the Tuxtla quail-dove as Endangered due to its very small and fragmented range that has undergone almost complete deforestation.

References

External links
BirdLife Species Factsheet.

Endemic birds of Eastern Mexico
Zentrygon
Birds described in 1941
Taxa named by Alexander Wetmore
Taxonomy articles created by Polbot